is a  after Bunkyū and before Keiō. This period  spanned only slightly more than a single year from March 1864 through April 1865.

The new era name was derived from the I Ching.

Change of era
 March 27, 1864 (Bunkyū 4/Genji 1, 20th day of the 2nd month) :  The new era name of Genji (meaning "original rule") was created to mark the beginning of a new 60-year cycle of the Chinese zodiac. The old era ended and a new one commenced in Bunkyū 4.

Events
 July 8, 1864 (Genji 1, fifth day of the sixth month): The Ikedaya Jiken, also known as the Ikedaya Affair or Ikedaya Incident, developed at the Ikedaya ryokan in Kyoto.
 August 12, 1864 (Genji 1, 11th day of the 7th month): Sakuma Shōzan is assassinated at age 53.  He had traveled from Edo to Kyoto on orders of the shogunate.  He was in favor of steps which would lead to an opening of the country, but his voice was stilled by death at the hands of a sonno joi supporter.
 September 5–6, 1864 (Genji 1, 5th–6th day of the eighth month): Bombardment of Shimonoseki

See also
Genji Kaku
Genji clan
Genji Monogatari
Genji Tsuushin Agedama
Genji Monogatari Sennenki

Notes

References
 Armstrong, Robert Cornell. (1914).  Light from the East Or Studies in Japanese Confucianism. Toronto: University of Toronto Press.  OCLC 220491442
 Griffis, William E. (1915).  The Mikado: Institution and Person.  Princeton: Princeton University Press. OCLC  413118
 Nussbaum, Louis Frédéric and Käthe Roth. (2005). Japan Encyclopedia. Cambridge: Harvard University Press. ; OCLC 48943301

External links
 National Diet Library, "The Japanese Calendar" -- historical overview plus illustrative images from library's collection

Japanese eras
1864 in Japan
1865 in Japan
1864 introductions
1860s disestablishments in Japan
1864 establishments in Japan